This is the list of notable footballers  who have played for Sporting de Gijón. Generally, this means players that have played 100 or more league matches for the club. However, some players who have played fewer matches are also included; this includes first nationals at the club, and some players who fell short of the 100 total but made significant contributions to the club's history or in his career.

Appearances and goals include La Liga, Segunda División and playoffs matches. Substitute appearances are included. Statistics are correct as of the end of the 2015–16 season.

Key

Players

Asturian flag is added for Spanish players born in Asturias.

References
List of players in BDFutbol.com
All Sporting footballers
"La historia del Sporting en La Liga"

Sporting
 
Association football player non-biographical articles
Players
Players